Judge Jack Komar is a Superior Court Judge of Santa Clara County, California.  He succeeded Justice Ronald B. Robie, of the California Court of Appeal, Third Appellate District.  Before joining the bench in 1985, Judge Komar was in general civil and criminal practice in San Jose, California for 16 years and was deputy district attorney for Santa Clara County from 1966 to 1969.  He served as the court's presiding judge from 1999 through 2000.

References
  Cal Court Ruling Could Spell End for Lead-Paint Lawsuits.
  Contempt Claim Brought in Internet Libel War.
  Contingency Fee Ruling in Lead Paint Case Heads for Calif. SC.
  Court Rejects 1970 Parcel Map, Excludes Parcels from Subdivision.
  InterNot Free Speech.
  In the Supreme Court of California.
  Judge and Jewry.
  San Jose Firebomber Gets 8-Year Sentence.

California state court judges
Living people
Law in the San Francisco Bay Area
People from Santa Clara County, California
Year of birth missing (living people)